Steve Crump (born 1957) is an American journalist, documentary film producer, and television reporter for WBTV. He is a graduate of Louisville's Trinity High School, and Eastern Kentucky University.

Crump is most known for his regional Emmy Awards for stories ranging from apartheid in South Africa to civil rights in the American South. He also has earned a number of other awards including four National Headliner Awards, the Gabriel Award, and more than a dozen first-place honors from the National Association of Black Journalists, as well as organizations like Sigma Delta Chi and Sister Cities International. In 2016, Crump was named the "2016 Journalist of the Year" by the National Association of Black Journalists.

Background
Crump was born in 1957 in Louisville's Smoketown neighborhood. He graduated from Trinity High School in the Class of 1975. He attended Eastern Kentucky University, where he earned a Bachelor's Degree in Communications.

Early career
Crump's career began in 1980, when he got a job as a DJ in Richmond, Kentucky. This job got him noticed by WSAV-TV, an NBC-affiliated television station, where he acquired an internship and was soon placed in front of the camera due to his iconic, booming voice.

Crump also worked for news stations in Orlando, Florida, Lexington, Kentucky, and Detroit, Michigan, as well an independent producer for Charlotte’s WTVI, BET, and Charlotte's PBS affiliate before coming to WBTV.

Filmography

{| border="0" style="width:70%;"
|-
| valign="top" |

References

Trinity High School (Louisville) alumni
Living people
1957 births
American male journalists
People from Louisville, Kentucky